The 1959–60 Soviet Championship League season was the 14th season of the Soviet Championship League, the top level of ice hockey in the Soviet Union. Eighteen teams participated in the league, and CSKA Moscow won the championship.

First round

Group A

Group B

Group C

Playoffs 
First round:
 CSKA Moscow – Kirovez Leningrad 3:3, 5:1, 7:3
 Krylya Sovetov Moscow – Spartak Sverdlovsk 5:2, 12:5
 Dynamo Moscow – Dynamo Novosibirsk 4:4, 6:2, 6:1
 Lokomotiv Moscow – HK Kalinin 4:3, 4:2

Quarterfinals:
 CSKA Moscow – Torpedo Gorky 5:6, 3:1, 8:0
 Krylya Sovetov Moscow – SKA Leningrad 9;2, 6:2
 Dynamo Moscow – Elektrostal 4:2, 4:0
 Lokomotiv Moscow – Traktor Chelyabinsk 2:3, 4:1, 9:2

Semifinals:
 CSKA Moscow – Krylya Sovetov Moscow 7:1, 5:0
 Dynamo Moscow – Lokomotive Moscow 5:1, 1:3, 5:3

Final:
 CSKA Moscow – Dynamo Moscow 10:4, 5:0, 5:1

Placing round 
Placing round games:
 Elektrostal – Traktor Chelyabinsk 5:2, 6:4
 Torpedo Gorky – SKA Leningrad 5:2, 2:3
 Dynamo Novosibirsk – SKA Kalinin 3:1, 2:1
 Kirovez Leningrad – Spartak Sverdlovsk 3:1, 0:5, 4:2

3rd place:
 Krylya Sovetov Moscow – Lokomotiv Moscow 7:3, 8:4

5th place
 Torpedo Gorky – Elektrostal 9:0, 5:1

7th place:
 SKA Leningrad – Traktor Chelyabinsk 6:3, 2:1

9th place:
 Dynamo Novosibirsk – Kirovez Leningrad

11th place:
 Spartak Sverdlovsk – SKA Kalinin 8:5, 1:2

13th-15th place:

16th-18th place:

External links
Season on hockeystars.ru

Soviet
Soviet League seasons
1959–60 in Soviet ice hockey